Arrow Creek is a tributary of the Missouri River in Montana in the United States. Approximately 45 miles (73 km) long, it rises in the Lewis and Clark National Forest near Highwood Baldy in the Highwood Mountains in southern Chouteau County. It flows south then east, then northeast and joins the Missouri in the White Cliffs Area on the border between Chouteau and Fergus counties.

See also

List of rivers of Montana
Montana Stream Access Law

References

Rivers of Montana
Tributaries of the Missouri River
Rivers of Fergus County, Montana
Rivers of Chouteau County, Montana
Rivers of Judith Basin County, Montana